30 and 32 Goodramgate and 11 and 12 College Street is a Grade II* listed building in the city centre of York, in England.

The building lies on the corner of Goodramgate and College Street.  The part facing College Street was constructed in the early-14th century, while the part facing Goodramgate was constructed in the 1380s or 1390s as part of a terrace of houses, replacing a large stone house which belonged to John le Romeyn.  The structure also includes a gatehouse which is believed to represent an entrance to the Mediaeval Minster Close, but which was completely rebuilt about 1600.  The main parts of the building were altered in the 18th- and 19th-centuries, when much of the timber was replaced with brickwork.

By 1752, part of the building was in use as the Angel Inn.  The Goodramgate façade is of 2 stories and 4 bays, and includes a double-storey gatehouse built in the 18th-century.  The ground floor of the entire building is currently in use as shops and cafes, with part occupied by the National Trust.  It was listed at grade II* in 1954.

References

Goodramgate
Goodramgate 30-32
Grade II* listed houses
Houses completed in the 14th century
Houses in North Yorkshire
Timber framed buildings in Yorkshire